Danilo Filipe Melo Veiga (born 25 September 2002) is a Portuguese professional footballer who plays as a right-back for Rijeka in Croatia.

Career
Veiga is a youth product of Estrelas de Fânzeres, Salgueiros, Porto and Paços de Ferreira. He began his senior career with Felgueiras in the Liga 3 in the 2021-22 season. On 25 May 2022, he transferred to the Primeira Liga side Gil Vicente. He made his professional debut with Gil Vicente in a 1–1 UEFA Europa League tie with Riga FC on 3 August 2022.

Personal life
Born in Portugal, Veiga is of Brazilian descent.

References

External links
 
 

2002 births
Living people
People from Gondomar, Portugal
Portuguese footballers
Portuguese people of Brazilian descent
F.C. Felgueiras 1932 players
Gil Vicente F.C. players
HNK Rijeka players
Primeira Liga players
Campeonato de Portugal (league) players
Association football fullbacks